Vagif Samadoghlu (5 June 1939 – 28 January 2015) was an Azerbaijani poet, playwright, publicist, People's Poet of the Republic of Azerbaijan, Deputy of the National Assembly of the Republic of Azerbaijan.

Biography
Vagif Samadoghlu was born on 5 June 1939 in Baku. After Vakilov graduated from the Music School named after Bulbul he studied at National Conservatory of Azerbaijan. Passed a professional course at the Moscow Conservatory named after Tchaikovsky (1962–1963).

He has worked as chief of art editorial office of Azerbaijani Soviet Encyclopedia (1968–1971) and editor-in-chief of the Oghuz Eli newspaper (1992–1994). Then Vakilov worked as a piano teacher at the National Conservatory of Azerbaijan (1963–1971), as the literary director of the movie-actor theater at the Azerbaijanfilm studio named after J. Jabbarly (1982–1985).

Vagif Samadoghlu was elected as a deputy to the National Assembly of the Republic of Azerbaijan in 2000 and 2005. He was a member of the delegation of Azerbaijan to the Council of Europe (2000–2005). He had been a member of the Union of Azerbaijani Writers since 1970.

The poet died on January 28, 2015, and was buried in the Alley of Honor.

Works
Vakilov had also worked in the field of poetry, theater and drama. The first press work named "Seven Poems" was published in 1963 in the journal "Azerbaijan". He started to artistic creativity in the 60's. In 1968 the first book "Telegrams on the Road" was published. Later "The Happiness of the Day", "Here I am, Divine", "Far, Green Island" were published.

He was also a talented playwright. The plays High Mountain, Lottery, Happiness ring, Summer snowball game, Man with green glasses, General's last command, Mamoy men's dreams were staged, and some of them have achieved great success in feature films and television productions.

Family

Awards

Honored Art Worker of the Azerbaijan SSR — 21 March 1989
Humay Award — 1998
Peoples Poet of the Republic of Azerbaijan — 9 December 1999
Presidential Pension of Azerbaijan — 2 October 2002
Shohrat Order — 5 June 2004
Sharaf Order — 4 June 2009
Istiglal Order — 2 June 2014
Nasimi Award — 2014

References

1939 births
2015 deaths
Azerbaijani poets